Khvosh Hava (also Romanized as Khvosh Havā; also known as Khoshharā, Khushwar, and Khvoshābād) is a village in Tabadkan Rural District, in the Central District of Mashhad County, Razavi Khorasan Province, Iran. At the 2006 census, its population was 772, in 181 families.

References 

Populated places in Mashhad County